Jackie Dingfelder is a Democratic politician in the U.S. state of Oregon. She is a former member of the Oregon State Senate and the Oregon House of Representatives, and later served as a part of Portland, Oregon Mayor Charlie Hales' staff.

Early life
Dingfelder has a bachelor's degree in Geography-Ecosystems Management from the University of California, Los Angeles and a master's degree in regional planning, with an emphasis on water resources management, from the University of North Carolina at Chapel Hill.

Political career
Dingfelder was appointed to the Oregon House of Representatives, representing District 19, in April 2001, to fill a vacancy created by the resignation of Jo Ann Hardesty (née Bowman). After redistricting based on data from the 2000 Census, Dingfelder represented House District 45. In the 2007–2008 session, Dingfelder chaired the House Energy and Environment Committee, and sat on the Agriculture and Natural Resources Committee. She also chaired a conference committee.

In 2009, she joined the Oregon State Senate representing District 23 (Northeast and Southeast Portland). In the Senate she chaired the Senate Environment & Natural Resources Committee, and sat on the Joint Ways and Means Subcommittee on Natural Resources and the Senate Judiciary Committee. Her support and advocacy in animal-related measures saw her labeled as a 2011 "Top Dog" by the Oregon Humane Society. In October 2013, Dingfelder resigned from the Senate to join the staff of the mayor of Portland. She resigned in July 2015 to pursue other interests.

References

External links
 Oregon State House – Jackie Dingfelder official government website

Living people
Democratic Party members of the Oregon House of Representatives
Women state legislators in Oregon
Democratic Party Oregon state senators
21st-century American politicians
21st-century American women politicians
Year of birth missing (living people)